John Callachor (10 November 1857 – 20 February 1924) was an Australian cricketer. He played one first-class match for New South Wales in 1882/83.

See also
 List of New South Wales representative cricketers

References

External links
 

1857 births
1924 deaths
Australian cricketers
New South Wales cricketers
Cricketers from Sydney